Susan Margaret St John  is an economist from New Zealand. She is a lecturer at the University of Auckland and spokesperson for the Child Poverty Action Group.

St John graduated with a Master of Arts in Economics from the University of Auckland in 1979. She has been a member of the university's teaching staff since 1981, initially in economics, and since 2012 in public policy. Her research has focused on the Accident Compensation Corporation, public sector and retirement policy. In 1994 she became a founding member of the Child Poverty Action Group, and has edited and authored a large number of reports for them.

In the 2010 Queen's Birthday Honours, St John was appointed a Companion of the Queen's Service Order, for services to social policy. In the 2019 Queen's Birthday Honours, she was appointed a Companion of the New Zealand Order of Merit, also for services to social policy.

References 

Living people
Companions of the Queen's Service Order
Companions of the New Zealand Order of Merit
New Zealand women academics
New Zealand economists
University of Auckland alumni
Academic staff of the University of Auckland
Year of birth missing (living people)